Sharfuddin is an Indian politician who served as a Member of the Bihar Legislative Assembly from Sheohar Assembly constituency representing the Janata Dal (United) in 2010 Bihar Legislative Assembly election.

References

Living people
Janata Dal (United) politicians
Year of birth missing (living people)
Bihar MLAs 2015–2020
Bihar MLAs 2020–2025
Lok Janshakti Party politicians